Ernest Ladd (November 28, 1938 – March 10, 2007), nicknamed "The Big Cat", was an American professional football player and professional wrestler. A standout athlete in high school, Ladd attended Grambling State University on a basketball scholarship before being drafted in 1961 by the San Diego Chargers of the American Football League (AFL). Ladd found success in the AFL as one of the largest players in professional football history at 6′9″ and 290 pounds. He helped the Chargers to four AFL championship games in five years, winning the championship with the team in 1963. He also had stints with the Kansas City Chiefs and Houston Oilers. Ladd took up professional wrestling during the AFL offseason, and after a knee injury ended his football career turned to it full-time in 1969.

As a professional wrestler, Ladd became one of the top heels in the business. For the majority of his career, he played a villainous character who would arrogantly taunt both opponents and crowds. Ladd feuded with many popular wrestlers of the time, including Wahoo McDaniel, André the Giant, Bobo Brazil, Dusty Rhodes, and Mr. Wrestling, before retiring from the ring in 1986.

Ladd was inducted into the Chargers Hall of Fame in 1981, the Grambling State University Hall of Fame in 1989, and the WWF Hall of Fame in 1995.

Ladd was diagnosed with colon cancer in the winter of 2003–2004, and died from the disease on March 10, 2007, at the age of 68.

Early life
Ladd was born in Rayville, Louisiana, and raised in Orange, Texas, where he was a high school football and basketball star. His football coach was William Ray Smith Sr., father of NFL star Bubba Smith. Ladd subsequently attended Grambling State University on a basketball scholarship. He was the nephew of Grambling and Houston Oilers teammate Garland Boyette.

Professional football career
Ladd was drafted in the fourth round of the 1961 NFL Draft by the Chicago Bears. He was also taken by the American Football League's San Diego Chargers with their 15th pick (119th overall) in the 1961 AFL draft.  He chose to sign with the Chargers.

At 6′9″ and 290 pounds, Ladd was said to be the biggest and strongest man in professional football during his era.  His physical measurements included a 52-inch chest, 39-inch waist, 20-inch biceps, 19-inch neck, and size 18D shoes.

Ladd played in four AFL championship games, helping the Chargers win the American Football League title in 1963 with teammate Earl Faison, both members of the original Fearsome Foursome. Ladd, an American Football League All-Star from 1962 through 1965, was one of the AFL players that organized a walkout on the 1965 AFL All-Star Game due to the racism they experienced in New Orleans.

Although Ladd found success with the Chargers, he had a contentious relationship with the Chargers front office. He started the 1965 season being indefinitely suspended from the team by Coach/General Manager Sid Gillman.

Ladd stated he and teammate Earl Faison would play out their contract options, opting to take a 10 percent cut in salary in exchange for becoming free agents at the end of the season. A planned trade with the Oilers in early 1966 would have sent Faison and Ladd to Houston. However, both were declared free agents by AFL commissioner Joe Foss, who ruled Oilers owner Bud Adams had tampered in trade dealings with the Chargers. Ladd refused to re-sign with the Chargers and suggested he might instead turn to professional wrestling full-time.

Eventually, Ladd signed with the Oilers and spent the 1966 season playing for them before moving in 1967 to the Kansas City Chiefs. There, with similarly king sized Grambling teammate and future Pro Football Hall of Famer Buck Buchanan (6′7″, 286 lbs), he filled out what was probably the biggest defensive tackle tandem in history. Both Ladd and Buchanan were inducted into the Grambling State University Athletic Hall of Fame.

Boston Patriots center Jon Morris said Ladd was so big "It was dark. I couldn’t see the linebackers. I couldn’t see the goalposts. It was like being locked in a closet." In 1981, Ladd was inducted into the Chargers Hall of Fame.

Professional wrestling career
Ladd started wrestling in 1961. As a publicity stunt, some wrestlers in the San Diego area challenged Ladd to a private wrestling workout. Before long, Ladd was a part-time competitor in Los Angeles, during football's off-season. Ladd became a huge draw in short order. When knee problems cut his football career short, Ladd turned to the more financially lucrative business of wrestling full-time in 1969. After a run as a fan favorite, Ladd became one of wrestling's most hated heels during the 1970s, as well as one of the first black wrestlers to portray a heel character. He riled crowds with his arrogant and colorful demeanor during interviews, especially with his less than politically correct nicknames for opponents such as Wahoo McDaniel (whom he referred to as "the Drunken Indian"), and Mr. Wrestling (whom he called "the Masked Varmint" and insisted he was an escaped criminal).  Ladd also controversially employed a taped thumb, claiming the support was needed due to an old football injury. Often when Ladd appeared to be in serious trouble during a match, he would walk out of the arena and accept a countout loss, known since as "pulling an Ernie Ladd".

Ladd wrestled for a number of different professional associations, including the World Wide Wrestling Federation numerous times form 1968 to 1981. Additionally, he had several successful runs in the NWA territories, The Mid-South promotion, NWF, and WWC promotion.

Known for his immense size and power, it was a natural for Ladd to engage in feuds with other giants, including famously with André the Giant (whom Ladd antagonizingly referred to as "Andre the Dummy" or "The Big Fat French Fry" during interviews).

In certain areas, Ladd's wrestling nickname was "The King", and he would wear an ornate crown. In other wrestling associations, he was "The Big Cat", and entered wearing a big cowboy hat.

After handily pinning Earl "Mr. Universe" Maynard the month prior, Ladd challenged Bruno Sammartino at Madison Square Garden for the WWWF title on March 1, 1976. In 1978, he wrestled WWWF champion Bob Backlund. When the International Wrestling Association had its brief run in the New York area, Ladd lost a two out of three falls match at Roosevelt Stadium, in Jersey City, New Jersey, to champion Mil Mascaras, two falls to one (he pinned Mascaras the first fall, was disqualified in the second, and was pinned by Mascaras in the third).

After leaving the WWWF, Ladd ventured to the Mid-South territory promoted by Bill Watts. While there, Ladd feuded with Paul Orndorff, Ray Candy, and Junkyard Dog. He also served as a manager to Afa and Sika, The Wild Samoans. Ladd also had a decent run as part of a tag team with "Bad" Leroy Brown in the early 1980s. Ladd also assisted Watts as a booker behind the scenes and had a large part in the development of Sylvester Ritter as the area's top draw.

Ladd retired from wrestling in 1986 due to recurring knee problems. He then returned to the WWF as a color commentator, calling the 20-man battle royal at Wrestlemania 2 (which featured NFL players) and then earning a trial run doing commentary for various shows, including the April 1986 show at Madison Square Garden. He was also used as a fill-in for matches on syndicated programming such as WWF Championship Wrestling. Ladd also teamed with Gorilla Monsoon and Johnny Valiant in the broadcast booth during The Big Event at C.N.E. Stadium in Toronto, Ontario.  Ladd, Monsoon, and Valiant were the original three-man team for the first few weeks of WWF Wrestling Challenge, before Ladd was replaced by Bobby Heenan and Valiant's role was reduced significantly to only calling matches when Heenan had to be at ringside for one of the wrestlers he managed. Following this, Ladd quietly left the WWF.

He wrestled one more match on January 3, 1988, at a WWF house show in Long Island, New York in a 20 man battle royal won by Bam Bam Bigelow.

He was inducted into the WCW Hall of Fame in 1994 and the WWF Hall of Fame class of 1995, becoming the first (and for several years only) inductee in both halls.

Later years

Ladd was a longtime friend of the Bush family and supported the 2000 campaign of George W. Bush. Ladd also owned and operated Big Cat Ernie Ladd's "Throwdown" BBQ Restaurant in New Orleans, Louisiana, until it was destroyed by Hurricane Katrina on August 29, 2005. In the disaster's aftermath, he ministered to Katrina evacuees at the Astrodome. He was a friend of WWE Hall of Fame commentator Jim Ross. Ladd also appeared in an episode of That '70s Show entitled "That Wrestling Show."  He was in the locker room with The Rock, who was playing his own father "Soul Man" Rocky Johnson. Ladd was also a basketball coach for young kids in Franklin, Louisiana.

Death
Ladd was diagnosed with colon cancer in the winter of 2003–2004, being advised he had three to six months to live. He reportedly ignored the doctor's diagnosis, stating “The doctor told me I had three to six months to live…I told the doctor that he’s a liar and that Dr. Jesus has got the verdict on me! I also told him, ‘You’re working with a miracle when you work with me.” The cancer eventually spread to his stomach and bones, and three years passed before he died on March 10, 2007, at the age of 68.

Championships and accomplishments
Cauliflower Alley Club
Other honoree (2005)
Central States Wrestling
NWA Central States Tag Team Championship (1 time) – with Bruiser Brody
Championship Wrestling from Florida
NWA Florida Heavyweight Championship (1 time)
NWA Southern Heavyweight Championship (Florida version) (1 time)
Georgia Championship Wrestling
NWA Georgia Tag Team Championship (1 time) – with Ole Anderson
Hollywood Wrestling / Worldwide Wrestling Associates
NWA Americas Heavyweight Championship (3 times)
WWA International Television Tag Team Championship (1 time) – with Edouard Carpentier
WWA World Tag Team Championship (1 time) – with Edouard Carpentier
National Wrestling Alliance
NWA Hall of Fame (Class of 2013)
National Wrestling Federation
NWF Brass Knuckles Championship (1 time)
NWF Heavyweight Championship (1 time)
NWF North American Heavyweight Championship (6 times)
NWA Big Time Wrestling
NWA American Heavyweight Championship (1 time)
NWA Brass Knuckles Championship (Texas version) (1 time)
NWA Texas Heavyweight Championship (1 time)
NWA Tri-State / Mid-South Wrestling Association
Mid-South Louisiana Heavyweight Championship (2 times)
Mid-South North American Heavyweight Championship (1 time)
Mid-South Tag Team Championship (2 times) – with Leroy Brown
NWA Arkansas Heavyweight Championship (1 time)
NWA North American Heavyweight Championship (Tri-State version) (5 times)
NWA United States Tag Team Championship (Tri-State version) (1 time) – with The Assassin
Pro Wrestling Illustrated
PWI ranked him # 205 of the 500 best singles wrestlers during the "PWI Years" in 2003.
Professional Wrestling Hall of Fame
Class of 2018
Southern California Pro-Wrestling Hall of Fame
Inducted 2020
World Championship Wrestling
WCW Hall of Fame (Class of 1994)
World Wrestling Association
WWA World Heavyweight Championship (1 time)
WWA World Tag Team Championship (1 time) – with Baron von Raschke
World Wrestling Council
WWC North American Heavyweight Championship (1 time)
World Wrestling Federation
WWF Hall of Fame (Class of 1995)
Wrestling Observer Newsletter
Wrestling Observer Newsletter Hall of Fame (Class of 1996)

See also
 List of American Football League players

References

External links
 
 
 TRIBUTE PAGES for Ernie Ladd
 

1938 births
2007 deaths
20th-century professional wrestlers
African-American players of American football
African-American male professional wrestlers
American football defensive tackles
American Football League All-Star players
American Football League players
American male professional wrestlers
Deaths from cancer in Louisiana
Fictional kings
Grambling State Tigers football players
Houston Oilers players
Kansas City Chiefs players
People from Rayville, Louisiana
Professional wrestling executives
Professional wrestlers from Louisiana
Professional Wrestling Hall of Fame and Museum
San Diego Chargers players
The Heenan Family members
WWE Hall of Fame inductees
20th-century African-American sportspeople
21st-century African-American people
NWF Heavyweight Champions
NWF North American Heavyweight Champions
NWA Florida Heavyweight Champions
NWA Southern Heavyweight Champions (Florida version)
WCWA Brass Knuckles Champions
NWA Americas Tag Team Champions
NWA Americas Heavyweight Champions
NWA Georgia Tag Team Champions
NWA National Television Champions